The Gaston–Strong House is a house located in southwest Portland, Oregon listed on the National Register of Historic Places. An early resident was Joseph P. Gaston.

See also
 National Register of Historic Places listings in Southwest Portland, Oregon

References

Further reading

1892 establishments in Oregon
A. E. Doyle buildings
Arts and Crafts architecture in Oregon
Goose Hollow, Portland, Oregon
Houses completed in 1892
Houses on the National Register of Historic Places in Portland, Oregon
Individually listed contributing properties to historic districts on the National Register in Oregon
Portland Historic Landmarks
Stick-Eastlake architecture in Oregon